The Biomolecule Stretching Database contains information about the mechanostability of proteins based on their resistance to stretching.

References

External links
 Official website

Protein structure
Biological databases